Suriname competed at the 1984 Summer Olympics in Los Angeles, United States, returning to the games after having boycotted the 1980 Olympics.

Athletics

Men

Judo

Men

Swimming

Men

References 
 Official Olympic Reports
 sports-reference

Nations at the 1984 Summer Olympics
1984
Oly